The Pacific Alliance is a Latin American trade bloc, formed by Chile, Colombia, Mexico and Peru, which all border the Pacific Ocean. The alliance was formed with the express purpose of improving regional integration and moving toward complete freedom in the movement of goods, services, capital and people between the four member states. Together, these four countries have a combined population of more than 230 million people and make up roughly 35 percent of Latin American GDP.

History 

The following countries are full members, in the process of becoming full members or observers.
On 28 April 2011, then president of Peru Alan García organized a meeting with the presidents of Chile, Colombia and Mexico at the time. This working group issued the Declaración de Lima, a statement of intent to establish the Pacific Alliance. The initial goal of the alliance was to further free trade with "a clear orientation toward Asia" and regional economic integration.

Together, the four member states of the Pacific Alliance represent nearly 35 percent of Latin American GDP. If it were counted as a single country, the Pacific Alliance would have a nominal GDP of US$2.02 trillion (US$4.32 trillion at PPP GDP rates), making it the 9th (or 7th) largest economy in the world. According to the World Trade Organization, the countries of the Pacific Alliance together exported roughly US$680 billion in 2019, almost twice as much as Mercosur, the other predominant Latin American trade bloc. Individually and collectively, the core countries of the Pacific Alliance have been deemed "The Pacific Pumas" by political scientists, for their model of economic and political development.

At the VII Pacific Alliance Summit in Cali, Colombia, on 22 May 2013, Costa Rica signed a trade agreement with Colombia, and later in the summit received approval for full membership from all the founding members. Costa Rica is finishing up the process so it can be readily incorporated as the Alliance's fifth member. At the same summit seven observers were admitted: the Dominican Republic, Ecuador, El Salvador, France, Honduras, Paraguay, Portugal, among others.

The Pacific Alliance currently has 54 observer states as of 2017, including economic heavyweights such as Japan, China, Germany, France, the United Kingdom, the United States and Indonesia, as well as three of the five Southern Common Market (Mercosur) countries and a member of the Bolivarian Alliance for the Peoples of Our America (ALBA). Analysts describe the Pacific Alliance as a tool to practise a kind of joint "nation-branding" to promote trade and investment and to enhance the international status and visibility of the member states.

Projects
In addition to reducing trade barriers, the Pacific Alliance has begun several other projects for regional integration, including visa-free tourist travel, a common stock exchange, and joint embassies in several countries.

Trade liberalization
In May 2016, the Pacific Alliance removed 92 percent of tariffs on goods traded between members. Based on a 2013 agreement, the rest of the tariffs will be removed by 2020.

On 26 January 2022, the Pacific Alliance signed its first collective free trade agreement with a nation outside the alliance: Singapore. Singapore had been a candidate for associate member status of the Pacific Alliance since 2017.

Mercado Integrado Latinoamericano
The Mercado Integrado Latinoamericano (MILA) originally integrated the stock markets of Colombia (Colombia Stock Exchange), Chile (Santiago Stock Exchange), and Peru (Lima Stock Exchange), and is seen as a foundation for the Alliance's economic integration. These three stock markets began their integration in November 2010; this made it Latin America's largest market according to number of issuers, the second by market capitalization, and the third by turnover.

The Mexican Stock Exchange began the process of incorporation into MILA and its full incorporation was expected by the year 2014. The Mexican Stock Exchange took the step of acquiring a total of 3.79 million shares of the Lima Stock Exchange (BVL), equivalent to 6.7 percent of the shares of Series A of that market. This is part of an agreement for a strategic partnership in order to develop joint business activities and development of the stock markets of Peru and Mexico, and eventually complete integration into MILA.

The Mexican Stock Exchange met the timeframe and announced the first trade made as part of MILA on 2 December 2014. The trade on MIILA was a $1,415 purchase of 200 shares in Chilean retailer Falabella, executed by GBM Mexico through GBM Chile. With the entry of Mexico into MILA, the integrated stock market now counts 780 issuers among the four countries, making it the biggest market by number of listed companies in Latin America, and the biggest in terms of market capitalization, according to the World Federation of Exchanges. The joint capitalization of the four bourses tops US$1.25 trillion, making it larger than the US$1.22 trillion BM&F Bovespa.

Joint diplomatic missions
Among the more important agreements that have been reached is the creation of joint diplomatic missions (embassies, consulates, etc.) that will provide citizens of Pacific Alliance member states with needed diplomatic services. The Declaration of Cali highlights the importance of the opening of an embassy shared between Chile, Colombia, Mexico and Peru in Ghana, as well as the agreement between Chile and Colombia to share embassies in Algeria and Morocco and between Colombia and Peru to share an embassy in Vietnam. The Declaration of Cali encourages these countries to move forward on these initiatives. In November 2014, Mexico opened its first trade office in Africa; located in Casablanca and shared with the other Pacific Alliance members.

Expansion

As of July 2018, there are 55 observer states of which two are candidate countries, in process of full membership, which are the Central-American countries of Costa Rica and Panama.

Canada has also been mentioned as a candidate to join the alliance, and called a "natural fit" by Mexico's vice-minister of foreign affairs, Sergio Alcocer. It has free-trade agreements with the four founding members, and has been encouraged by regional leaders to join the alliance. However the Canadian government has yet to upgrade its observer status to observer-candidate as it is still determining whether or not to become a member.

Costa Rica began the process of joining on 10 February 2014 at the eighth summit of the Alliance in Cartagena de Indias, Colombia, when President Laura Chinchilla signed a protocol at a plenary session finalizing the decision to join the alliance. The country had since postponed its incorporation into the alliance indefinitely, pending consultations by its presidential economic council. However, on 8 July 2022, President Rodrigo Chaves Robles announced that Costa Rica had applied to become a full member of the Alliance.

Ecuador has been critical of the alliance in conjunction with other leaders of ALBA, but its president, Rafael Correa, has also speculated on a possible future bid if integration advances in areas other than trade.

Guatemala has expressed concrete interest in joining the Pacific Alliance and is pursuing trade deals with current members as a precursor to a possible membership application.

Panama has expressed interest in joining the Alliance, and is an official observer-candidate according to the website. Panama has already signed trade deals with Colombia, Peru and Chile, and reached an agreement with Mexico to sign a free-trade deal in March 2014. While fulfilling most of the criteria to enter in the alliance, the country has so far refused to commit itself to full membership.

Paraguay, a founding member of Mercosur and observer of the Pacific Alliance, has begun pursuing free-trade deals with current members as a precursor to a possible membership application. Paraguay was suspended from Mercosur following the impeachment of Fernando Lugo, although Paraguay asked Mercosur to lift the sanction. After the election and inauguration of Horacio Cartes, Paraguay has so far claimed "Paraguay would not abandon Mercosur", but assured it will seek to join the alliance. The government has said it is reportedly considering joining the Pacific Alliance in addition to rejoining Mercosur.

U.S. Vice President Joe Biden expressed that the United States was willing to join the Pacific Alliance as an observer on 23 May 2013, in Bogotá, Colombia, during a bilateral meeting with Colombian President Juan Manuel Santos.

Argentine President Mauricio Macri, during his campaign and in press conferences after the election, has expressed his desire to bring his country closer to the Pacific Alliance and also work on integration between the bloc and his country's trade bloc Mercosur.

Uruguay has been encouraged to join the alliance by existing members Peru and Colombia, and is reportedly considering the possibility of accession.

Honduras officially applied for formal membership in October 2016, with the vocal support of Chile.

List of Summits

Members

Full members

Associated state

Candidate Associate members

 (in the process of becoming a full member)

Observers

See also
The Pacific Pumas
Mercosur
Trans-Pacific Strategic Economic Partnership Agreement
Bolivarian Alliance for the Americas
Trans-Pacific Partnership
Rules of Origin
Market access
Free-trade area
Tariffs

Notes

References

External links
 Pacific Alliance website

Regionalism (international relations)
Organizations based in Latin America
International organizations based in the Americas
Organizations established in 2012
2012 in South America